Luay, Luayy or Louay (Arabic: لُؤَيّ lū’ayy), also spelled Loai, Loay or Luai, is an Arabic male given name from the noun la’y (لَأْي), meaning "Strong, Patient, a Sheild and/or Protector".
Notable people with the name include:

Given name 
 Luay Hamza Abbas, Iraqi writer
 Louay Almokdad, Syrian-British businessman and politician
 Luai al-Atassi, Syrian military leader
 Louay Chanko, Syrian footballer
 Louay Kayyali, Syrian modern artist
 Luay Nakhleh, Palestinian-Israeli-American professor of computer science
 Louay M. Safi, Syrian-American scholar of Islam
 Luay Salah, Iraqi footballer
 Loai al-Saqa, Syrian al-Qaeda member
 Loay Taleb, Syrian footballer

Family name 
Ka'b ibn Lu'ayy, ancestor of the Islamic prophet Muhammad

Arabic masculine given names